Ryan Sweeting (born July 14, 1987) is an American former professional tennis player.

Personal life
Sweeting was born in Nassau, Bahamas. He has been living in Fort Lauderdale, Florida and registered as an American to the ATP.

In September 2013, Sweeting became engaged to actress Kaley Cuoco after three months of dating. They married on December 31, 2013, in Santa Susana, California. Cuoco announced in September 2015 that she was filing for divorce. The divorce was finalized in May 2016.

Tennis career

Juniors
Sweeting represented The Bahamas in his junior years. He attended Guizar Tennis Academy and was coached by renowned Mexican tennis coach, Nicolas Guizar. In 2005, he won the US Open Boys' Singles title, beating Jérémy Chardy in the final.

As a junior, Sweeting compiled a singles win–loss record of 94–51 (89–46 in doubles), reaching as high as no. 2 in the junior world rankings in September 2005.

2006
In 2006, he attended the University of Florida in Gainesville, Florida, where he played for the Florida Gators men's tennis team in NCAA competition. He made his professional US Open debut in 2006, where he defeated Argentine Guillermo Coria in the first round (Coria retired while down 3–2) before losing to Belgian Olivier Rochus in five sets. Sweeting served as a practice partner for the U.S. Davis Cup team in the 2006 World Group semifinal against Russia in Moscow.

2007–2008

Sweeting turned professional in 2007. Sweeting captured four ProCircuit doubles titles in 2007. He won the Rimouski Challenger in Canada in November 2008 for his first ProCircuit singles title. He finished 2008 ranked no. 216 in the ATP world rankings.

2009
Sweeting captured the Dallas Challenger singles title in February 2009, without dropping a set. In April, at the US Men's Clay Court Championships in Houston, Texas, Sweeting and doubles partner Jesse Levine lost to Americans Bob and Mike Bryan, ranked no. 1 in the world, in the doubles final.

2011
At the US Men's Clay Court Championships in Houston, Sweeting won his only ATP World Tour singles title by beating Kei Nishikori of Japan in the final in straight sets.

ATP career finals

Singles: 1 (1 title)

Doubles: 1 (1 runner-up)

ATP Challenger and ITF Futures finals

Singles: 6 (4–2)

Doubles: 8 (4–4)

Performance timelines

Singles

Doubles

Junior Grand Slam finals

Singles: 1 (1 title)

See also 

Florida Gators
List of Florida Gators tennis players

References

External links
 
 

1987 births
American male tennis players
American people of Bahamian descent
Bahamian emigrants to the United States
Bahamian male tennis players 
Florida Gators men's tennis players
Grand Slam (tennis) champions in boys' singles
Living people
Sportspeople from Nassau, Bahamas
Sportspeople from Fort Lauderdale, Florida
Tennis people from Florida
US Open (tennis) junior champions
University of Florida alumni